Jude Coleman (born 16 February 1981 in Beaudesert, Queensland) is a former Australian cricket player. Coleman has played 60 Women's National Cricket League matches for the Queensland Women Cricket team.

After Kirsten Pike, Coleman has taken the second most wickets for Queensland in the Women's National Cricket League.

References

Further reading

 

Living people
Australian cricketers
1981 births